The Fife Coast Express, formerly the Fifeshire Coast Express, was a named passenger train operating in the United Kingdom.

History
The summer service was started in 1910 by the North British Railway under the name Fifeshire Coast Express, as a Glasgow to Crail train at 4.20pm on a Friday evening, returning at 6.17am on Monday morning. This enabled businessmen to house their families on the coast during the summer, and travel to stay with them at weekends. From the following summer it ran daily, Monday to Friday.

In 1924 it became known as the Fife Coast Express. The named train was withdrawn on the outbreak of the Second World War but was re-introduced for the summer of 1949.

It was withdrawn on 5 September 1959.

References

North British Railway
Named passenger trains of the London and North Eastern Railway
Named passenger trains of British Rail
Railway services introduced in 1912
1912 establishments in England